Eunidia meleagris is a species of beetle in the family Cerambycidae. It was described by Per Olof Christopher Aurivillius in 1926. It is known from Kenya, Ethiopia, and Somalia.

References

Eunidiini
Beetles described in 1926